Maahad Muhammadi Lelaki or Maahad Muhammadi Lilbanin (Arabic: المعهد المحمدي للبنين; English: "Muhammadi Secondary School for Boys") is a prominent Islamic secondary school in Kelantan, Malaysia. It is located at Jalan Pengkalan Chepa, Mukim Padang Bongor, Kota Bharu. The school is state-funded and governed by the Islamic Foundation of Kelantan (Yayasan Islam Kelantan).

The school has played an important role in the history and course of academic development of Kelantan. It uses two-tier system in its education: conventional and Islamic academiae.

History
The history of Maahad Muhammadi Lelaki can be traced back to the 1st of April, 1937 (Thursday; 20th of Muharram, 1356 AH), when it was founded as al-Madrasah al-Muhammadiah al-Arabiyah at Kelantan Council of Religion and Malay Custom Building (currently, the Islamic Museum of Kelantan; next-to Muhammadi Mosque) in Jalan Sultan by a royal charter from His Royal Highness Sultan Ismail ibni Sultan Muhammad IV, the then-Sultan of Kelantan.

The first principal was Mr Sayid Abu Bakr bin Abdullah bin Abdul Rahman Al-Attas, a Singaporean from Arab lineage. Its syllabus follows the Egyptian al-Azhar secondary school system, given to Mr Sayid by the then-Grand Imam of al-Azhar, Sheikh Mustafa al-Maraghi.

From being a school focusing only on Arabic and Islamic knowledge, it started to introduce English language subject into the syllabus on 1954, followed by Malay language subject in 1961. Social sciences studies such as History, Geography, Mathematics, Economics and Science was started in year 1971.

Al-Azhar University has recognized the certificate from Maahad Muhammadi (شهادة المعهد المحمدي) since year 1960.

Maahad Muhammadi Lelaki shares a common history with Maahad Muhammadi Perempuan and Maahad Muhammadi Pasir Pekan; but not with Maahad Muhammadi Tumpat, Maahad Muhammadi Rantau Panjang, or Maahad Muhammadi Pasir Mas.

Throughout its history, the school has changed its name several times:
 Al-Madrasah Al-Muhammadiah Al-Arabiah (1937-1942)
 Al-Madrasah Al-Arabiah Jame’ Merbau Al-Ismaili (1942-1956)
 Al-Maahad Al-Muhammadi Al-Qismu Al-Arabi (1956-1973)
 Al-Maahad Al-Muhammadi (1975-1982)
 The school was separated into Maahad Muhammadi Lelaki (for boys) dan Maahad Muhammadi Perempuan (for girls) (1 July 1982 – now)

Maahad Muhammadi Pasir Pekan was initially founded in 1989 as a temporary site to accommodate the male students in Pasir Pekan, Tumpat while waiting the current building to be completed. Later, it was made as a permanent school on its own as Maahad Muhammadi Pasir Pekan.

Logo

Objects

The crest symbolises the strength and valour of Maahad Muhammadi Lelaki's students.

The circular riband symbolises the ‘limitless world.’ Maahad Muhammadi students is to master all fields of knowledge.

Colours

Red symbolises courage.

Green is one of the syi’ar of Islam. It represents the colour of heaven, faithfulness, unity, and the practice of Islamic teachings.

Yellow represents the school's status of honour and community hope towards the school.

Three background colours motifs represent the purpose of human creation: being a caliph, a servant of God, and a missionary of Islam.

Texts

The use of Jawi texts symbolises the harmonious integration of religious and scientific knowledge and to value its heritage by instilling moral values into the souls of Maahad Muhammadi students.

The word اقرأ is the first revelation to Muhammad.

Al-Maahad Al-Muhammadi (in Arabic text) 1937: The school's name in Arabic and commemoration of the year the school was established.

Notable people

Faculty
 Datuk Nik Abdul Aziz Nik Mat, former Chief Minister of Kelantan

References

External links
Maahad Muhammadi Lelaki

Kota Bharu
Schools in Kelantan
1937 establishments in British Malaya
Educational institutions established in 1937
Secondary schools in Malaysia